5-(Nonyloxy)tryptamine is a tryptamine derivative which acts as a selective agonist at the 5-HT1B receptor. Increasing the O-alkoxy chain length in this series gives generally increasing potency and selectivity for 5-HT1B, with highest activity found for the nonyloxy derivative, having a 5-HT1B binding affinity of 1.0 nM, and around 300-fold selectivity over the related 5-HT1A receptor.

See also 
 5-Benzyloxytryptamine
 5-Carboxamidotryptamine
 5-Ethoxy-DMT
 Sumatriptan

References 

Serotonin receptor agonists
Tryptamines
Indole ethers at the benzene ring